3rd AFCA Awards

Best Film:
There Will Be Blood

The 3rd Austin Film Critics Association Awards, honoring the best in filmmaking for 2007, were announced on December 20, 2007.

Top 10 Films
 There Will Be Blood
 No Country for Old Men
 Juno
 Into the Wild
 3:10 to Yuma
 Knocked Up
 Before the Devil Knows You're Dead
 Atonement
 American Gangster
 Eastern Promises

Winners
 Best Film:
 There Will Be Blood
 Best Director:
 Paul Thomas Anderson – There Will Be Blood
 Best Actor:
 Daniel Day-Lewis – There Will Be Blood
 Best Actress:
 Elliot Page – Juno
 Best Supporting Actor:
 Javier Bardem – No Country for Old Men
 Best Supporting Actress:
 Allison Janney – Juno
 Best Original Screenplay:
 Juno – Diablo Cody
 Best Adapted Screenplay:
 No Country for Old Men – Joel Coen and Ethan Coen
 Best Cinematography:
 There Will Be Blood – Robert Elswit
 Best Original Score:
 There Will Be Blood – Jonny Greenwood
 Best Foreign Film:
 Black Book (Zwartboek) • Netherlands
 Best Documentary:
 The King of Kong: A Fistful of Quarters
 Best Animated Film:
 Ratatouille
 Best First Film:
 Ben Affleck – Gone Baby Gone
 Breakthrough Artist:
 Michael Cera – Juno and Superbad
 Austin Film Award:
 Grindhouse – Robert Rodriguez and Quentin Tarantino

Notes

References

External links
 IMDb page
 Official website

2007 film awards
2007